Tinja-Riikka Tellervo Korpela (born 5 May 1986) is a Finnish professional footballer who plays as a goalkeeper for Tottenham Hotspur in the FA WSL. She previously played for Bayern Munich in the German Frauen-Bundesliga, Tyresö FF in Sweden's Damallsvenskan, LSK Kvinner and Kolbotn of Norway's Toppserien, and FC Honka of Finland's Naisten Liiga.

Korpela debuted for Finland's national team in 2007. She represented her country at the UEFA Women's Championships in 2009 and 2013.

Club career

Swedish UEFA Women's Champions League contenders Tyresö FF signed Korpela to a contract in December 2013. Korpela competed with Carola Söberg for a starting place and was a substitute in Tyresö's 4–3 defeat by Wolfsburg in the 2014 UEFA Women's Champions League Final. Tyresö suffered a financial implosion in 2014 and withdrew from the 2014 Damallsvenskan season, expunging all their results and making all their players free agents.

Korpela signed a two-year contract with German Frauen-Bundesliga club FC Bayern Munich in June 2014. On 18 February 2016, she extended her contract until 2018. At their request and in agreement of the association their contract was dissolved at the end of 2017; She left FC Bayern Munich after just three and a half years. It was duly approved before the last round game on 17 December 2017 before the home game against 1. FFC Frankfurt.

On 6 July 2021, Korpela signed for Tottenham after leaving Everton in the WSL.

International career

Korpela was part of the Finland squad at the 2006 FIFA U-20 Women's World Championship. She made her senior Finland women's national football team debut in March 2007, against Sweden at the Algarve Cup. By the time of UEFA Women's Euro 2009, hosted in Finland, Korpela was the first choice goalkeeper.

In June 2013, Korpela was named in national coach Andrée Jeglertz's Finland squad for UEFA Women's Euro 2013. After playing in Finland's first two matches at the tournament, she was replaced with longstanding rival Minna Meriluoto for the final group game; a 1–1 draw with Denmark.

On 21 October 2021, she played her 100th match for Finland in a 3–0 win over Georgia in the 2023 FIFA Women's World Cup qualification.

Personal life 
Korpela is openly gay.

Honours

FC Honka 
 Naisten Liiga: Winner 2006, 2007, 2008

 Bayern München
 Bundesliga: Winner 2014–15, 2015–16

References

External links

Player's profile at Football Association of Finland 

1986 births
Living people
Finnish women's footballers
Finnish expatriate footballers
Expatriate women's footballers in Norway
Expatriate women's footballers in Sweden
Expatriate women's footballers in Germany
Finland women's international footballers
Tyresö FF players
FC Bayern Munich (women) players
Kansallinen Liiga players
FC Honka (women) players
Toppserien players
LSK Kvinner FK players
Tottenham Hotspur F.C. Women players
Women's association football goalkeepers
Finnish expatriate sportspeople in Norway
LGBT association football players
Damallsvenskan players
Finnish expatriate sportspeople in Sweden
Finnish expatriate sportspeople in Germany
Frauen-Bundesliga players
Lesbian sportswomen
Sportspeople from Oulu
Oulun Luistinseura players
Finnish LGBT sportspeople
FIFA Century Club
UEFA Women's Euro 2022 players